Backyard Builds is a Canadian home renovation reality series, which premiered in 2017 on HGTV. Hosted by designer Sarah Keenleyside and contractor Brian McCourt, the series features the duo redesigning and renovating homeowners' back yards into more flexible and versatile outdoor living spaces.

The series received a Canadian Screen Award nomination for Best Lifestyle Program or Series at the 6th Canadian Screen Awards in 2018.

References

2017 Canadian television series debuts
2010s Canadian reality television series
HGTV (Canada) original programming
2020s Canadian reality television series